Stefan Collini (born 6 September 1947) is an English literary critic and academic who is Professor of English Literature and Intellectual History at the University of Cambridge and an Emeritus Fellow of Clare Hall. He has contributed essays to such publications as The Times Literary Supplement, The Nation and the London Review of Books. He completed his undergraduate degree and PhD at Jesus College, Cambridge, and also completed a master's degree at Yale University.

Bibliography

 That Noble Science of Politics: A Study in Nineteenth-Century Intellectual History (1983) with J. W. Burrow and Donald Winch
 Public Moralists: Political Thought and Intellectual Life in Britain 1850–1930 (1991)
 The Two Cultures, by C. P. Snow, introduction by Stefan Collini (1993)
 Matthew Arnold: A Critical Portrait (1994)
 English Pasts: Essays in History and Culture (1999)
 "'No Bullshit' Bullshit." London Review of Books. 23 January 2003. (accessed 29 October 2009).
 Absent Minds: Intellectuals in Britain (2006)
 Common Reading: Critics, Historians, Publics (2009)
 "Modernism and the little magazines." The Times Literary Supplement. 7 October 2009. (accessed 8 October 2009).
 That's Offensive!: Criticism, Identity, Respect, Seagull Books (15 February 2011). 
 What Are Universities For?, Penguin (23 February 2012)
 Common Writing: Essays on Literary Culture and Public Debate, Oxford (2016)

The Nostalgic Imagination. History in English Criticism. Oxford University Press (2020)

Critical studies and reviews of Collini's work
 Review of Speaking of Universities.

References

External links 
 Stefan Collini, University of Cambridge
 Contributor page at the London Review of Books
 Contributor page at The Nation
 Journalisted page
 Review of What Are Universities For? The Oxonian Review, 23 April 2012.
 "The Two Cultures - A Conversation with Stefan Collini", Ideas Roadshow, 2013

1947 births
Living people
English literary critics
Fellows of Clare Hall, Cambridge
Alumni of Jesus College, Cambridge
Yale University alumni
English people of Italian descent